The following is a list of the largest airlines in Europe by total scheduled and chartered passengers, in millions. The list includes companies headquartered in the Asian portions of Russia, Turkey, Kazakhstan and Azerbaijan. The order of the chart and its completion goes only up to the year 2021.

Notes

See also
 List of airlines of Europe
 World's largest airlines

References

Further reading
 

Europe
 Largest
Airlines of Europe